Jaakko is a Finnish male first name, etymologically rooted in the Biblical names Jacob or James. The name day of Jaakko in the Finnish calendar is July 25. Jaakko may refer to:

Kings who are in English named James are in Finnish named Jaakko
Jakob De la Gardie in Finnish "Laiska-Jaakko" ("Jakob the lazy"), a Swedish count; nowadays laiskajaakko is the synonym for a lazy person
Jaakko Taneli Autere, Finnish ballet dancer
Jaakko Blomberg (born 1942), Finnish diplomat
Jaakko Elenius, Finnish editor-in-chief and a theologian
Jaakko Forsman (1839–1899), Finnish jurist and politician, leading activist of the Fennoman movement
Jaakko Haavio, Finnish writer and a priest
Jaakko Hallama (born 1917), Finnish former Foreign Ministry official
Jaakko Heinimäki, Finnish writer and a priest
Jaakko Hintikka, Finnish philosopher
Jaakko Hämeen-Anttila, Finnish professor in Arabian language and Islam
Jaakko Ihamuotila (born 1939), Finnish business executive
Jaakko Ilkka, Finnish rebel
Jaakko Itälä, Finnish politician
Jaakko Jonkka (born 1953), Chancellor of Justice of Finland (from July 2007)
Jaakko Kalela (born 1944), Finnish civil servant and diplomat
Jaakko Kolmonen (born 1941), Finnish chef
Jaakko Kivi, Finnish politician
Jaakko Kuusisto (1974—2022), Finnish violinist, conductor and composer
Jaakko Laajava (born 1947), Finnish Under-Secretary of State for Foreign and Security Policy
Jaakko Laakso, Finnish politician
Jaakko Lepola (born 1990), Finnish football player
Jaakko Löytty, Finnish gospel musician
Jaakko Mäntyjärvi (born 1963), Finnish composer of classical music, professional translator
Jaakko Mattila (born 1976), Finnish painter
Jaakko Nyberg (born 1980), Finnish football defender
Jaakko Ojaniemi, Finnish sportsman
Jaakko Paavolainen (1927–2007), Finnish historian
Jaakko Pakkasvirta, Finnish actor
Jaakko Pellinen, Finnish professional ice hockey forward
Jaakko Pöyry, Finnish industrialist
Jaakko Rissanen, Finnish professional ice hockey player
Jaakko Ryhänen (born 1946), Finnish opera singer
Jaakko Salo, Finnish composer
Jaakko Salovaara, Finnish musician
Jaakko Syrjä, (1926–2022), Finnish writer
Jaakko Tallus (born 1981), Nordic combined athlete from Finland and Olympic gold medallist
Jaakko Teppo, Finnish artist
Jaakko Tähtinen, Finnish architect
Jaakko Turtiainen, Finnish professional ice hockey forward
Jaakko Valtanen (born 1925), Finnish general
Jaakko Vuorinen (1923–1982), Finnish Olympic fencer
Jaakko Wallenius (born 1958), Finnish writer and journalist

See also
Jaakko Ilkka (opera), opera by Finnish composer Jorma Panula
Sarvijaakko, timberman beetle.

Finnish masculine given names